Stephen Chapin (born December 30, 1946) is an American singer-songwriter. He is best known as the youngest of the four Chapin brothers, which include Harry Chapin and Tom Chapin and is son of drummer Jim Chapin and Elspeth Burke Chapin Hart, editor, artist and matriarch of the Burke, Leacock, Chapin clan.  He is the father of Christina Chapin, Frankie Chapin, and Jonathan Chapin.  He is the uncle of Jen Chapin and The Chapin Sisters. He has toured nationally and internationally, with his own band; The Harry Chapin Band; and with his late brother Harry Chapin as his band leader, musical director, arranger, producer, piano player/multi instrumentalist and singer.  He continues to perform concerts all over the world with The Harry Chapin Band which includes the original members of the band: Steve Chapin, Big John Wallace, and Howard Fields, and new members since 2005, Clark Wallace (Big John's son) and Jonathan Chapin (Steve's son).

Chapin has also produced many albums including The Chapin Family Christmas Album, and has worked as a teacher, arranger, recording artist, commercial producer, performer, singer, and songwriter. He has appeared on all Harry Chapin albums, and arranged and produced most of them.  Most notably,  Harry Chapin's Greatest Stories Live album which includes his performance of one of his songs "Let Time Go Lightly".

The Harry Chapin Band includes Chapin and former Harry Chapin band members "Big John" Wallace and Howard Fields. Chapin and Wallace have been making music together since their mid-1950s choir-boy days at Grace Church Brooklyn Heights, through the doo-wop days, folk and early rock eras, and the Harry Chapin years. It was during the mid-1970s that they teamed up with Howard to forge the musical bonds that forge the heart of their music.

References

External links
  
Chapin Family

1946 births
Living people
American male singer-songwriters
Singer-songwriters from New York (state)
Record producers from New York (state)